Danzig (February 12, 1977 – January 4, 2006) was an American Thoroughbred racehorse who is best known as a leading sire. He was purchased for $310,000 (equivalent to $ million in ) by Henryk de Kwiatkowski at the 1978 Saratoga Yearling Sale. The son of Hall of Famer Northern Dancer and the most commercially successful sire of the second half of the 20th century, he won all three of his races before knee problems ended his racing career.

Stud record

Danzig was retired to stand at stud at Claiborne Farm near Paris, Kentucky, where he became one of the world's most important sires.  He led the U.S. sires list from 1991 to 1993 and topped the sire list in Spain and the United Arab Emirates.

Danzig sired 188 graded stakes race winners and 10 champions.  His foals have earned more than $100 million in purse money and include Breeders' Cup winners Chief's Crown, Lure, Dance Smartly, and War Chant as well as European champions Dayjur and Anabaa. Danzig also sired 1992 Preakness Stakes winner Pine Bluff and is the sire of Canadian Horse Racing Hall of Fame inductee Langfuhr, who in turn sired Canadian Triple Crown winner and Horse of the Year Wando.

A leading sire of sires, Danzig sired Danehill, the first Thoroughbred in history to sire 300 stakes winners, while another son, Green Desert, has champions Oasis Dream, Ouija Board, Sea The Stars, and Kingman amongst his descendants. Danzig was also the damsire of Fusaichi Pegasus and Dancethruthedawn and was the grandsire of 2008 Kentucky Derby and Preakness winner Big Brown.  His son Hard Spun finished second in the 2007 Kentucky Derby behind Street Sense.

Danzig and his son Danehill were dominant bay sires along with another 17 of Danzig's sons: they would not produce chestnut progeny and only a grey if the foal's dam was grey. 

Danzig was pensioned at 27 in 2004 and on January 3, 2006, was humanely euthanized due to the infirmities of old age. He was buried at Claiborne Farm's equine cemetery.

Pedigree

See also
Claiborne Farm
List of leading Thoroughbred racehorses
Northern Dancer
Northern Dancer sire line
Thoroughbred breeding theories

References

1977 racehorse births
2006 racehorse deaths
Racehorses bred in Pennsylvania
Racehorses trained in the United States
Undefeated racehorses
United States Champion Thoroughbred Sires
Thoroughbred family 7-a
Chefs-de-Race